The National Union of Textile Workers was a trade union representing workers in the textile industry in England, principally in Yorkshire.

History
The union was founded in 1922 when the General Union of Textile Workers merged with the National Society of Dyers and Finishers and the Yeadon, Guiseley and District Factory Workers' Union.  By the end of 1923, it had 52,876 members, and this rose rapidly, reaching 65,496 three years later.  However, it was hit heavily by job losses during the Great Depression and disputes between different sections of workers, the small Pattern Weavers' Society splitting away in 1930.

By 1933, membership of the union had fallen to only 36,000.  Ben Turner, who had been involved with the union and its predecessor for many years, resigned as General President, and it was agreed that future presidents would not work on a full-time salaried basis.

For many years, the union was a member of the Federation of Unions in the Bleaching, Dyeing, Finishing, and Calico Printing Trades, working with the Amalgamated Society of Dyers, Bleachers and Kindred Trades, and the Operative Bleachers, Dyers and Finishers Association.  The federation increasingly took the lead on negotiations with employers on pay and conditions.  In 1936, the three unions voted to merge, forming the National Union of Dyers, Bleachers and Textile Workers.

Election results
The union sponsored a Labour Party candidate at each Parliamentary election, with Turner twice winning election.

Officials

General Presidents
1922: Ben Turner
1933: Clement Naylor
1935: F. W. Sowerby

General Secretaries
1922: Arthur Shaw

References

Defunct trade unions of the United Kingdom
1922 establishments in the United Kingdom
Textile and clothing trade unions
Trade unions established in 1922
Trade unions disestablished in 1936
Trade unions based in West Yorkshire
History of the textile industry in the United Kingdom